Imelda Concepcion (born 1936) was an actress associated with Sampaguita Pictures.  She appeared primarily in supporting roles.

Concepcion was first noticed as a friend of Rita Gomez in a Pancho Magalona-Linda Estrella movie called Milyonarya at Hampaslupa (The Millionaire & the Pauper).

She served as one of the female leads in Fred Montilla & Tessie Agana swashbuckler movie, Nagkita si Kerubin at Si Tulisang Pugot (Kerubin Meets the Headless Bandit).

Filmography

1954 - Milyonarya at Hampaslupa
1954 - Nagkita si Kerubin at si Tulisang Pugot
1954 - Menor de Edad
1955 - R.O.T.C.
1955 - Iyung-Iyo
1956 - Prince Charming

External links

1936 births
Living people
Filipino film actresses